

Kelly  is a locality in the Australian state of South Australia located on the Eyre Peninsula about  north-west of the state capital of Adelaide and about  south-east of the municipal seat in Kimba.

Kelly's boundaries were created on 6 May 1999 for the “local established name”.  On 1 August 2017, a parcel of land was taken from the adjoining locality of Mangalo and added to the locality of Kelly to ensure that all of land identified as “Allotment 50, in Deposited Plan 68070” was in the locality.  The 2017 boundary change resulted in all of the locality's boundaries now aligning with those of the cadastral unit of the Hundred of Kelly with exception to the boundary with the locality of Kimba in the hundred's north-west corner.

Land use within the locality is ’primary production’ with exception to land dedicated to the protected area known as the Malgra Conservation Park.

The 2016 Australian census which was conducted in August 2016 reports that Kelly had 77 people living within its boundaries.

Kelly is located within the federal division of Grey, the state electoral district of Giles and the local government area of the District Council of Kimba.

References

Towns in South Australia
Eyre Peninsula